Tugimaantee 15 (ofcl. abbr. T15), also called the Tallinn–Rapla–Türi highway, is a 97.2-kilometre-long north-south national basic road in northern Estonia. The highway begins at the Tallinn district of Nõmme on national road 4 under the name of Viljandi maantei. It crosses national road 11 in Luige and passes through Kohila, Hagudi, Rapla, Kehtna, Lelle and Käru to national road 5 in Türi.

Route
T15 passes through the following counties and municipalities:
Harju County
Tallinn
Kiili Parish
Saku Parish
Rapla County
Kohila Parish
Rapla Parish
Kehtna Parish
Järva County
Türi Parish

See also
 Transport in Estonia

References

External links

N15